Panabá Municipality is one of the 106 municipalities in the state of Yucatán, Mexico. It is located in the eastern region of the Yucatán Peninsula's northern coast. Panabá is also the name of the municipality's largest township, which is also its municipal seat (cabecera municipal). The municipality borders San Felipe and Rio Lagartos to the north, Tizimín to the east, Sucilá to the south and the municipalities of Dzilam de Bravo and Dzilam González to the west.

The modern Spanish spelling Panabá derives from the place`s name in the Yucatec Maya language, meaning "[place of] water found by digging". The Mayan name combines the verb  "to dig, to excavate" (verbal root pan-) with the noun for "water."

Political Regionalisation

The municipality belongs to the First Federal Electoral District and the Tenth Local Election District.

Foundation 
Pre-Columbian ruins have been discovered on a site in the village of Panabá showing that this place was inhabited during the pre-Hispanic period by Indians in the province of Domes.

Throughout the colonial period, Panabá was under the jurisdiction of Valladolid through Tizimín. As a result of changes in the peninsula during the nineteenth century Panabá was part of the municipality of Tizimín until 1918.

Historical Monuments

Architecturally the town is notably attractive. The beautiful temple of San Pedro the Apostle is located in the city.

Ethnic Groups

The population of indigenous language (Yucatec Maya) speakers (5 years and over) is 2,465 people.

Demographic Trends

According to the Census of Population and Housing made in June 2010 by the INEGI, the total population of the municipality was 7,461 people, of whom 3,718 are male and 3,713 are female. The total population of the town represents 0.32 per cent of the total population of the state.

Climate

Education, Health and Housing

The town has 4 levels of schools: preschool, primary, secondary and high school. There is a library located in the headquarters. A literacy campaign made by the National Institute for Adult Education (INEA) succeeded in increasing literacy in the municipality. In 1980, there was 663 people counted as illiterate and by 1986 this number was reduced to 136. According to the 2010 census, the literacy rate for people between 15 and 24 years of age was 97.2%.

One medical unit of the Instituto Mexicano del Seguro Social (IMSS) is found in Panabá, in addition to private care.

Typical housing in the region is constructed from wooden posts with wattle and daub walls (locally known as bajareques) and roofed with Huan, (long narrow plant leaves), however most are built with concrete blocks, cement, wood and sheet-metal.

Clothing and Customs

Women normally wear simple hupiles, highlighting the embroidered square neck and edge of the clothing. This is worn over a medium length skirt of figured fustian supported by a waistband of the same material. As footwear they wear sandals and to protect themselves from the sun they wear shawls. Country people, especially the elderly, dress in baggy trousers made from blanket material, a shirt buttoned down the front, an apron of ticking and a straw hat.

For farm shows and major fiestas the women dress up in a terno, a three piece outfit of full-length white skirt with decorated hem, an under-garment made with fine materials and with a colored border and over this is worn a highly decorated top with a square neck, decorated with lace and usually hand-made embroidery in cross stitch. This is complemented by long gold chains, earrings, coral rosaries, filigree decorations and a shawl with the Virgin Mary.

The men wear white straight cut pants, jackets without lapels (locally called Filipino jackets) made of fine material, the better one having gold buttons, espadrilles and jipijapa hats, without forgetting the traditional red scarf popularly known as a bandana and essential for the jarana, a local dance.

For All Saints' Day and The Day of the Dead it is tradition to place an altar in a main room in the house, where the favorite food of the dead is offered up to them. Traditional Mucbil chicken accompanied by atole of corn and chocolate beaten with water. In the regional fiestas people dance in jaranas and there is showing off among the participants.

Food

The savory cuisine of the region is composed of pork, chicken and venison, with spicy sauces with a base of habanero chilli and maize. Some of these dishes are: beans with pork, egg with chaya (tree spinach), chicken soup, filled cheese (typically an Edam cheese filled with chopped meat and sauce) salbutes, panuchos, pipián de venado (venison in red pumpkin seed sauce), papadzules, longaniza, cochinita pibil, joroches (various filled fritters), mucbi-chicken (baked chicken pie), and tamales.

Typical desserts are cassava fritters with honey, baked pumpkin with honey, sweet potato with coconut, coyol palm fruit in syrup, pumpkin seed marzipan, melcochas (sweets made of beaten thick honey in different shapes) arepas, tejocotes in sweet syrup and ciricote (a local fruit).

Typical drinks are Xtabentún  Balché, anise liqueur, horchata, corn atole (a drink made from fresh maize), fruit juices of the region.

Settlements
The municipality contains some 135 officially named localities (localidades), among which the most populous settlements are 
 Cenote Yalsihon Buena Fe
 Loché
 Panabá (municipal seat)
 San Francisco (Campeche City)
 San Juan del Río

References

External links
 Official Site of the State of Yucatán
 municipality Panabá

Municipalities of Yucatán